Pamela Mavis Crowe MBE is a former Member of the Legislative Council of the Isle of Man.  Prior to entering politics she was a director of Crowes Ltd and an author of several books.  She was the MHK for Rushen from 1997 to 2003, when she was elected to the Legislative Council.

Governmental positions
Chairman of the Isle of Man Post Office, 2004–2008
Minister of Local Government and the Environment, 2002–2004
Chairman of the Isle of Man Office of Fair Trading, 1997–2002

References

Living people
Manx women in politics
Members of the House of Keys 1996–2001
Members of the House of Keys 2001–2006
20th-century British women politicians
21st-century British women politicians
Members of the Legislative Council of the Isle of Man
Manx women writers
20th-century Manx writers
20th-century women writers
Year of birth missing (living people)